Knik Arm (Dena'ina: Nuti) is a waterway into the northwestern part of the Gulf of Alaska. It is one of two narrow branches of Cook Inlet, the other being Turnagain Arm. Knik Glacier empties into the Knik Arm.  The Port of Anchorage is located on the arm.

Etymology
The Dena'ina name for Knik Arm is Nuti, meaning "salt water". The name "Knik" comes from igniq, the Iñupiaq word for "fire". It has been written Kinik, Kneep, Kneik, Kook, Knuyk, and Kweek.

Geography
Knik Arm begins at the Inlet's northern edge, near Anchorage, before heading north and east. West of Knik Arm is the delta of the Susitna River, the largest stream emptying into the inlet. At the head of Knik Arm, at the mouth of Knik River, was the village (ghost town) of Knik. Knik Arm's other major tributaries are Ship Creek, Eagle River, Peter's Creek, Eklutna River and Fish Creek. The greater part of the plain, lying between the Knik Arm and the Susitna River, is drained by the Little Susitna. The upper part of Knik Arm merges into the delta of the Knik and Matanuska rivers, which unite just above tide limits.

History
Knakatnuk and Nitak (or Nitakh) were historic native villages on the arm's shore. The 1964 Alaska earthquake destroyed or significantly damaged most of the Anchorage neighborhoods adjacent to the Arm, including the downtown area. The Knik Arm ferry was a proposed year-round passenger and auto ferry across the arm which was to use the M/V Susitna SWATH / barge convertible expedition craft.

References

External links

Estuaries of Alaska
Bodies of water of Anchorage, Alaska
Bodies of water of Kenai Peninsula Borough, Alaska
Bodies of water of Matanuska-Susitna Borough, Alaska
Denaʼina